Balaton Sound (also known as Heineken Balaton Sound between 2007 and 2012 and as MasterCard Balaton Sound since 2013 for sponsorship reasons) is one of Europe's largest open air electronic music festivals. Held annually since 2007 on the southern bank of Lake Balaton, Hungary, it features live acts and DJs from all around the world, from established artists to new names. The event was co-created by the organizers of Sziget Festival.

Background
As the festival gets more famous and popular each year, tickets are usually sold out before they go on sale at the official ticket vendors; this event sets new attendance records yearly.

The first Balaton Sound festival was held between 12 July and 15 July 2007. The fact that the event was held on the shore of the largest lake in Central Europe in mid-summer, its twenty-hour music schedule, and the line-up gained it significant public interest.

The festival is located on the west part of Zamárdi at the crossing of Panoráma and Zöldfa utca (street).

Inside the festival area variable stages, lounges, and tents are established for the performances. The sponsors of the festival create luxurious chill-out facilities with hammocks, bean bags, and easy chairs. Visitors to Balaton Sound can stay at a special campsite with several pubs, cocktail bars and restaurants equipped with accoutrements absent from Hungary's other summer music festivals. The Main Stage area has a capacity of about 50,000.

According to a KPMG study over the four days of the event in 2008, 88,000 attendants visited the festival while the daily average reached 22,000. Over 1.6 billion HUF was spent by visitors in total, 41,000 HUF per person, mostly spent on entrance fees, food and accommodation. In 2009, the number of festival visitors reached 94,000. In 2012 it became the second largest music festival in Hungary (after the Sziget Festival), and one of the most populated electronic music festivals in Europe.

The 2012 festival won the European Festivals Award in the category Best Medium-Sized European Festival in early 2013.

In 2018 the festival headliners included (amongst others) David Guetta, Alesso, Dimitri Vegas & Like Mike and The Chainsmokers. A statement by the festival producers confirmed that the 2018 festival broke its previous attendance record, with 165,000 attending, 8000 more than the previous record.

Balaton Sound 2019 will start on 3 July and will end on 7 July, featuring headliner performances by J Balvin, Future and DJs Armin Van Buuran, Tiesto and Marshmello.

Pre-sale ticket prices:

Line-ups

The following are the festival line-ups for 2007, 2008, 2009, and 2013.

2007:

2008:

2009:

2013:

2018

Dimitri Vegas & Like Mike, The Chainsmokers, Martin Garrix, NERVO, Timmy Trumpet, W&W, David Guetta, DJ Snake, TY Dolla $ign, Jonas Blue

Picture gallery

See also

List of electronic music festivals

References

External links
http://www.sziget.hu/balatonsound/
https://web.archive.org/web/20090412155703/http://globetrekker.hu/balaton-sound-09/
https://archive.today/20130103062016/http://www.hungarotickets.com/balatonsound/

Music festivals established in 2007
2007 establishments in Hungary
Electronic music festivals in Hungary
Summer events in Hungary